= South Orange/Maplewood Community Coalition on Race =

The South Orange/Maplewood Community Coalition on Race is an intentional integration organization located in Maplewood and South Orange, New Jersey. Founded in 1996 as the Racial Balance Task Force by the governing bodies of the two towns, it is a grass roots non-profit with 501(c)(3) status.
